Leo Dean (4 October 1914 – 22 August 1985) was an Australian rules footballer who played with Geelong in the Victorian Football League (VFL).

Notes

External links 
		

1914 births
1985 deaths
Australian rules footballers from Victoria (Australia)
Geelong Football Club players
North Geelong Football Club players